Tieteberga (RV 737) is a partially lost dramma per musica by Antonio Vivaldi. The Italian libretto was by Antonio Maria Lucchini.

The opera was first performed at the Teatro San Moisè in Venice on 16 October 1717. The opera included nine arias by other composers.

Roles

Recordings
" L'innocenza sfortunata" and "Se fido rivedro" Ann Hallenberg (mezzo-soprano), Modo Antiquo, Federico Maria Sardelli (conductor), 2005
"Sento in seno ch'in pioggia di lagrime" (Lotario) Philippe Jaroussky, Ensemble Matheus, Jean-Christophe Spinosi (conductor), 2006
"La gloria del mio sangue" Nathalie Stutzmann, Orfeo 55  2011

References

1717 operas
Operas by Antonio Vivaldi
Italian-language operas
Operas
Opera seria